Sanderson station is an Amtrak railway station serving the small West Texas town of Sanderson. The unstaffed station is located alongside Downie Street in the southwest corner of the town. The station  accommodates travelers who use the combined Sunset Limited and Texas Eagle between Los Angeles and New Orleans or Chicago, respectively.

Service 
The station sees six weekly arrivals, three in each direction. The westbound Sunset Limited and Texas Eagle stop at the station at around 8:30 am on Tuesday, Thursday and Sunday, while the eastbound train stops at about 10:30pm on Monday, Thursday and Saturday.

Sanderson is one of the least-used Amtrak stops in its national system, owing to the town's small population. In Amtrak's , Sanderson station served  passengers, an average of  passengers per day.

History 

The stop was formerly the site of a Galveston, Harrisburg and San Antonio Railroad (GH&SA) depot, later owned by Southern Pacific and Union Pacific. A large prefabricated clapboard wooden depot was assembled at the site in 1882 and expanded in 1910.

The east end of the depot included a lunchroom, a common feature in the days before dining cars became common. Trains would make a stop at Sanderson, where passengers could get off for a quick meal, before reboarding to continue their journeys. The restaurant also served as a community center in the early days a of town, a place where residents could meet for a meal or a cup of coffee.

Even after the decline of passenger rail travel, Sanderson's depot was still well used, serving as a crew change terminal for the Southern Pacific Railroad until 1995. When the crew change point moved out of the town, the depot was abandoned, and began to rapidly deteriorate. Southern Pacific was later purchased by Union Pacific, and the new railroad owners quickly identified Sanderson for demolition due to high maintenance costs. Local citizens advocated for  rehabilitating or moving the historic depot, but were ununable to secure funding. The depot was demolished in October 2012.

For several years after the depot was demolished, only an Amtrak information sign remained at the site.

On May 27, 2021, a fully rebuilt station opened at the site. The $3 million project added an open-air shelter with a built-in bench to provide seating in the shade, a concrete platform, a concrete parking area, and concrete walkways. The entire station is now fully in compliance with the Americans with Disabilities Act. The passenger shelter is built with a base of stone in gray and brown tones, from which rises a framework of massive timbers joined by metal connector plates to support the roof. Amtrak says the passenger shelter’s rustic design reflects the area’s natural beauty, which includes habitat supporting a great variety of cacti.

References

External links 

 Sanderson Amtrak Station (USA Rail Guide -- Train Web)

Amtrak stations in Texas
Former Southern Pacific Railroad stations
Transportation in Terrell County, Texas
Buildings and structures in Terrell County, Texas
Railway stations in the United States opened in 1882